4138 Kalchas  is a large Jupiter trojan from the Greek camp, approximately  in diameter. It was discovered on 19 September 1973, by Dutch astronomers Ingrid and Cornelis van Houten at Leiden, on photographic plates taken by Tom Gehrels at the Palomar Observatory in California. The assumed C-type asteroid is the principal body of the proposed Kalchas family and has a rotation period of 29.2 hours. It was named after the seer Calchas from Greek mythology.

Orbit and classification 

Kalchas is a dark Jovian asteroid in a 1:1 orbital resonance with Jupiter. It is located in the leading Greek camp at the Gas Giant's  Lagrangian point, 60° ahead of its orbit . It orbits the Sun at a distance of 4.9–5.4 AU once every 11 years and 9 months (4,286 days; semi-major axis of 5.16 AU). Its orbit has an eccentricity of 0.04 and an inclination of 2° with respect to the ecliptic. The body's observation arc begins with a precovery taken at Palomar in May 1956, more than 17 years prior to its official discovery observation.

Palomar–Leiden Trojan survey 

While the discovery date aligns with the second Palomar–Leiden Trojan survey, Kalchas did not receive a  prefixed survey designation, which was assigned for the discoveries made by the fruitful collaboration between the Palomar and Leiden observatories in the 1960s and 1970s. Gehrels used Palomar's Samuel Oschin telescope (also known as the 48-inch Schmidt Telescope), and shipped the photographic plates to Ingrid and Cornelis van Houten at Leiden Observatory where astrometry was carried out. The trio are credited with the discovery of several thousand asteroids.

Kalchas family 

Fernando Roig and Ricardo Gil-Hutton identified Kalchas as the principal body of a small Jovian asteroid family, using the hierarchical clustering method (HCM), which looks for groupings of neighboring asteroids based on the smallest distances between them in the proper orbital element space. According to the astronomers, the Kalchas family belongs to the larger Menelaus clan, an aggregation of Jupiter trojans which is composed of several families, similar to the Flora family in the inner asteroid belt.

However this family is not included in David Nesvorný HCM-analysis from 2014. Instead, Kalchas is listed as a non-family asteroid of the Jovian background population on the Asteroids Dynamic Site (AstDyS) which based on another analysis by Milani and Knežević.

Naming 

This minor planet was named from Greek mythology after Calchas, a Greek prophet during the Trojan War. The official naming citation was published by the Minor Planet Center on 11 March 1990.

Physical characteristics 

Kalchas is an assumed C-type asteroid, with a V–I color index of 0.81.

Rotation period 

In December 2011, a rotational lightcurve of Kalchas was obtained by Robert Stephens at GMARS  in California. Lightcurve analysis gave a well-defined rotation period of  hours with a brightness variation of 0.40 magnitude. In July and August 2015, photometric observations by the Kepler space observatory determined two concurring periods of 29.13 and 29.411 hours.

Diameter and albedo 

According to the surveys carried out by the NEOWISE mission of NASA's Wide-field Infrared Survey Explorer and the Japanese Akari satellite, Kalchas measures 46.46 and 61.04 kilometers in diameter and its surface has an albedo of 0.082 and 0.057, respectively. The Collaborative Asteroid Lightcurve Link assumes a standard albedo for a carbonaceous asteroid of 0.057 and calculates a diameter of 53.16 kilometers based on an absolute magnitude of 10.1.

References

External links 
 Asteroid Lightcurve Database (LCDB), query form (info )
 Dictionary of Minor Planet Names, Google books
 Discovery Circumstances: Numbered Minor Planets (1)-(5000) – Minor Planet Center
 Asteroid 4138 Kalchas at the Small Bodies Data Ferret
 
 

004138
Discoveries by Cornelis Johannes van Houten
Discoveries by Ingrid van Houten-Groeneveld
Discoveries by Tom Gehrels
Named minor planets
19730919